Anicet Eyenga (born 9 August 1986) is a Cameroonian former professional footballer who played as a striker.

Career
Eyenga was born in Douala. In 2010 Eyenga played for Cotonsport Garoua In June 2010 he joined RC Strasbourg.

During his career played in Germany, France, Vietnam, Turkey, Finland, Malaysia, Algeria, Morocco. Northern Cyprus, Greece, Hungary, Malta and Albania.

Eyenga trialled with Veikkausliiga club Rovaniemi PS in February 2015 and appeared in the 2015 Finnish League Cup during this time.

He later played for SV Oberkirch in the German Landesliga Südbaden.

References

External links
 
 

Living people
1986 births
Footballers from Douala
Cameroonian footballers
Association football forwards
V.League 1 players
ASO Chlef players
Çetinkaya Türk S.K. players
Coton Sport FC de Garoua players
Olympiacos Volos F.C. players
KF Elbasani players
RC Strasbourg Alsace players
Negeri Sembilan FA players
Haiphong FC players
FCSR Haguenau players
Cameroonian expatriate sportspeople in Morocco
Cameroonian expatriate sportspeople in Hungary
Cameroonian expatriate sportspeople in Malaysia
Cameroonian expatriate sportspeople in Greece
Cameroonian expatriate sportspeople in Albania
Cameroonian expatriate sportspeople in Vietnam
Cameroonian expatriate sportspeople in Algeria
Cameroonian expatriate sportspeople in Germany
Cameroonian expatriate sportspeople in Finland
Cameroonian expatriate sportspeople in Turkey
Cameroonian expatriate sportspeople in France
Expatriate footballers in Albania
Expatriate footballers in Greece
Expatriate footballers in Malta
Expatriate footballers in Northern Cyprus
Expatriate footballers in France
Expatriate footballers in Morocco
Expatriate footballers in Vietnam
Expatriate footballers in Malaysia
Expatriate footballers in Finland
Expatriate footballers in Germany
Expatriate footballers in Turkey
Expatriate footballers in Iraq
Expatriate footballers in Hungary